Rafael Nadal defeated the defending champion Roger Federer in a rematch of the previous year's final, 6–4, 7–6(7–5) to win the men's singles tennis title at the 2010 Madrid Open.

Seeds
The top eight seeds receive a bye into the second round.

Draw

Finals

Top half

Section 1

Section 2

Bottom half

Section 3

Section 4

Qualifying

Seeds

Qualifiers

Lucky losers

Qualifying draw

First qualifier

Second qualifier

Third qualifier

Fourth qualifier

Fifth qualifier

Sixth qualifier

Seventh qualifier

External links
Main Draw
Qualifying Draw

Mutua Men's Singles
MS